Anatoliy Isakovich Lure (19 July 1901 – 12 February 1980) was a Soviet engineer and applied mathematician, notable for his contributions to nonlinear control.

1901 births
1980 deaths
Soviet engineers